Bentleigh railway station is located on the Frankston line in Victoria, Australia. It serves the south-eastern Melbourne suburb of Bentleigh, and it opened on 19 December 1881 as East Brighton. It was renamed Bentleigh on 1 May 1907.

History

Bentleigh station opened on 19 December 1881, when the railway line from Caulfield was extended to Mordialloc. Like the suburb itself, the station was named after Thomas Bent, former Premier of Victoria between 1904-1909.

A goods siding once existed at the station. It closed in 1922, and it and the connections to the siding were removed in that same year. In 1944, a crossover at the Down end of the station was abolished.

In 1974, boom barriers replaced interlocked gates at the former Centre Road level crossing, which was located at the Down end of the station.

On 28 June 1987, the Up face of the former ground level island platform was brought into use. The former pedestrian underpass was also provided during this time.

In 1998, Bentleigh was upgraded to a Premium Station. Prior to the works, Bentleigh closely resembled McKinnon. Also around this time, the underpass was filled in.

In 2006, the station's former pedestrian level crossing was upgraded as part of a VicTrack trial of new crossing technology. Additional warning devices were also fitted, with the common red pedestrian sign, as well as an LED light box saying "Another Train Coming", which is lit when either an express train is approaching on the southbound line, or when a train is approaching after another train on the northbound line.

In May 2015, the Level Crossing Removal Authority announced a grade separation project to replace the Centre Road level crossing, immediately south of the station. This included rebuilding the station. On 4 June 2016, the station closed for demolition. On 29 August of that year, the rebuilt station opened.

Bentleigh was one of the stations set to received funding through the Morrison Government's controversial Commuter Car Park Scheme, where funding was allocated to stations without consultation with local councils, and which the Auditor-General labelled ‘pork-barrelling’. As of 2021, City of Glen Eira was starting community consultation over the proposal, with concerns that the funding was ‘tainted’.

Platforms and services

Bentleigh has one island platform with two faces, and one side platform. It is serviced by Metro Trains' Frankston line services.

Platform 1:
  all stations services to Flinders Street, Werribee and Williamstown

Platform 2:
  all stations services to Flinders Street, Werribee and Williamstown; all stations services to Frankston

Platform 3:
  morning peak-hour all stations services to Frankston

Transport links

Ventura Bus Lines operates two routes via Bentleigh station, under contract to Public Transport Victoria:
 : to Oakleigh station
  : Middle Brighton station – Blackburn station

Gallery

References

External links
 Melway map

Premium Melbourne railway stations
Railway stations in Melbourne
Railway stations in Australia opened in 1881
Railway stations in the City of Glen Eira